Charles, Charlie or Chuck Wright may refer to:

Charles 
 Charles Wright (born 1961), better known as The Godfather, American professional wrestler
 Charles Wright (botanist) (1811–1885), American botanist
 Charles Wright (cricketer) (1863–1936), Nottinghamshire and England cricketer
 Charles Wright (gridiron football) (born 1964), American player of gridiron football
 Charlie Wright (Kent cricketer) (1895–1959), English cricketer
 Charles Wright (mayor) (1937–1998), American politician, mayor of Davenport, Iowa, from 1977 to 1981
 Charles Wright (musician) (born 1940), leader of Charles Wright & the Watts 103rd Street Rhythm Band
 Charles Wright (novelist) (1932–2008), American novelist
 Charles Wright (poet) (born 1935), American poet
 Charles Wright (speedway rider) (born 1988), speedway rider
 Charles Wright (athlete), English athlete
 Charles Alan Wright (1927–2000), American legal scholar
 Charles Barstow Wright (1822–1898), American financier
 Charles Conrad Wright (1917–2011), American religious historian
 Charles Cushing Wright (1796–1857), American medallist and engraver, founding member of the National Academy of Design
 Charles Frederick Wright (1856–1925), U.S. Representative from Pennsylvania
 Charles H. Wright (1918–2002), Detroit physician and founder of the Charles H. Wright Museum of African American History
 Charles Henry Conrad Wright (1869–1957), professor of French language and literature
 Charles Henry Hamilton Wright (1836–1909), Irish Anglican clergyman
 Charles Ichabod Wright (1828–1905), British member of parliament for Nottingham, 1868–1870
 Charles O. Wright (1873–1922), Alberta politician
 Charles Romley Alder Wright (1844–1894), English chemistry and physics researcher
 Charles Seymour Wright (1887–1975), Canadian Antarctic explorer
 Charles "Specs" Wright (1927–1963), American jazz drummer
 Charles Theodore Hagberg Wright (1862–1940), English librarian

Charlie 
 Charlie Wright (born 1938), Scottish football manager and player

Chuck 
 Chuck Wright (born 1959), American bassist
 Chuck Wright (politician) (1919–2016), American politician, Mayor of Topeka, Kansas, from 1965 to 1969

See also 
 Charles Wright & the Watts 103rd Street Rhythm Band, an American soul and funk band formed in the early 1960s